Islington Works railway station was located on the Gawler railway line located in the inner northern Adelaide suburbs of Regency Park and Kilburn to serve the adjacent Islington Railway Workshops.

Both platforms are 50 metres in length. The station was first closed in 2000, with all trains running express, and demolished in 2020, due to the Gawler line electrification project.

To the west of the station lies the Australian Rail Track Corporation Adelaide-Crystal Brook line.

References

Disused railway stations in South Australia
Railway stations closed in 2000
Buildings and structures demolished in 2020